Soma Kumari Tennakoon (18 June 1960 – 24 September 2009) was a Sri Lankan politician from the Kurunegala District. She was a former member of the Parliament of Sri Lanka and served as a top member of the Wayamba Provincial Council representing the United People's Freedom Alliance. She also held the title of chairman of Laksala. At the time of her death, she was visiting Hambantota in order to help the Southern Provincial council elections. She was the daughter of Mudiyanse Tennakoon who was a member of parliament, from 1956 to 1977.

References

External links 
 https://web.archive.org/web/20090108221727/http://www.dailynews.lk/2008/12/15/news31.asp

1958 births
2009 deaths
Members of the 12th Parliament of Sri Lanka
Women legislators in Sri Lanka
21st-century Sri Lankan women politicians
20th-century Sri Lankan women politicians